Calvatia booniana, the western giant puffball, is a puffball mushroom that can grow 10 to 70 centimetres (3.9 to 28 in) in diameter, as large as its close relative, the giant puffball of eastern North America and Europe.  Like the giant puffball, it grows on composted soil such as in meadows, fields, and forests,, as well as on roadsides, sagebrush flats, pastures, and other sunny places.  In general, western giant puffballs occur on the west side of the Rockies and giant puffballs occur on the east side. However, on the West Coast of North America the western giant puffball is replaced by the giant puffball or a closely related species.

The exterior is white or tan. Unlike giant puffballs, which are smooth, the western giant puffball is covered with plaques or large pointed warts. The interior is first firm and white, then yellow and slimy, and finally powdery.

Reproduction
Unlike most puffballs the western giant puffball reproduces in three stages asexually. Smaller western giant puffballs usually clump of the epididymal covering of the parent.

Cooking
The western giant puffball is edible when completely white inside.  (Those that have even traces of yellow or green can cause upset stomachs.)  It does not wash well, so trimming most of the dirt off is best.  Washing with water makes it too soggy to saute.  It is seasoned the same way as the giant puffball.  It is good cubed and cooked in soup, breaded and deep-fried, steamed, sauteed, or simmered like other mushrooms.  The western giant puffball, like the giant puffball, does not dehydrate well but can be cooked (to prevent it from becoming mush) and then frozen.  After it thaws it should be cooked again.  With the texture of tofu or marshmallows it is similar to the giant puffball.  Like many other foodstuffs (and many puffballs), not all of them taste the same.

References

Fungi described in 1964
Lycoperdaceae
Edible fungi
Taxa named by Alexander H. Smith